Lutna is a rural locality (a selo) and the administrative center of Lutenskoye Rural Settlement, Kletnyansky District, Bryansk Oblast, Russia. The population was 679 as of 2010. There are 9 streets.

Geography 
Lutna is located 11 km northwest of Kletnya (the district's administrative centre) by road. Osinovka is the nearest rural locality.

References 

Rural localities in Kletnyansky District